Eremothera is a genus of flowering plants in the family Onagraceae containing 7-12 species (7 species and 5 subspecies), native to Western North America.

Species:

 Eremothera boothii (Douglas) W.L.Wagner & Hoch
 Eremothera boothii subsp. alyssoides (Hook. & Arn.) W.L.Wagner & Hoch
 Eremothera boothii subsp. condensata (Munz) W.L.Wagner & Hoch
 Eremother boothii subsp. decorticans (Hook. & Arn.) W.L.Wagner & Hoch
 Eremothera boothii subsp. desertorum (Munz) W.L.Wagner & Hoch
 Eremothera boothii subsp. intermedia (Munz) W.L.Wagner & Hoch
 Eremothera chamaenerioides (A.Gray) W.L.Wagner & Hoch
 Eremothera gouldii (P.H.Raven) W.L.Wagner & Hoch
 Eremothera minor (A.Nelson) W.L.Wagner & Hoch
 Eremothera nevadensis (Kellogg) W.L.Wagner & Hoch
 Eremothera pygmaea (Douglas) W.L.Wagner & Hoch
 Eremothera refracta (S.Watson) W.L.Wagner & Hoch

References 

Onagraceae
Onagraceae genera